On 3 August 1979, a Constitutional Convention election was held in Isfahan Province constituency with plurality-at-large voting format in order to decide four seats for the Assembly for the Final Review of the Constitution.

The Islamic Republican Party won. Because of conflicts and the major support the People's Mujahedin of Iran received among different minorities and Iranian sectors, Ayatollah Khomeini published a fatwa that prevented the group from taking part in elections of the new government.

Unlike other provinces, the constituency was not contested by groups such as the Freedom Movement of Iran or the Organization of Iranian People's Fedai Guerrillas.

Results 

 
 
 
 
|-
|colspan="14" style="background:#E9E9E9;"|
|-
 
 
 
 
 
 
 
 
 
 
 
 
 
 
 
 
 
 
 
 
 

|colspan=14|
|-
|colspan=14|Source:

References

1979 elections in Iran
Isfahan Province